Dominique Laffin (June 3, 1952, in Saint-Mandé, Val-de-Marne, France – June 12, 1985, in Paris) was a French actress who appeared in 19 films between 1975 and 1985.

Laffin made her major film debut in 1977, gaining critical acclaim for her role in Jacques Doillon's 1979 film, La Femme qui pleure. For her performance, she was nominated for the César Award for Best Actress. That same year, she co-starred with a young Roberto Benigni in the film Chiedo asilo.

Her career was cut short at the age of 33 by a massive heart attack. Her daughter later said that she believed Laffin had committed suicide, but says that she has not been able to confirm this either way. During her short career, Laffin appeared with many of France's rising young stars, including Gérard Depardieu, Juliette Binoche and Miou-Miou, as well as established stars such as Yves Montand.

Laffin is buried near the renowned director François Truffaut in the Cimetière de Montmartre in the Montmartre Quarter of Paris.

Her daughter, the French politician Clémentine Autain, was born in 1973.

Partial filmography

 Le pied!.. (1975)
 Dites-lui que je l'aime (This Sweet Sickness) (1977) - Lise
 La Nuit, tous les chats sont gris (At Night, All Cats Are Grey) (1977) - La vendeuse
 Les petits câlins  (The Little Wheedlers)(1978) - Sophie
 Les Seize ans de Jérémy Millet (1978, short)
 The Crying Woman (1979) - Dominique
 Félicité (1979) - Dominique
 Tapage nocturne (Nocturnal Uproar) (1979) - Solange
 Chiedo asilo (Seeking Asylum) (1979) - Isabella
 L' Oeil du maître (His Master's Eye) (1980) - Hélène
 L'Empreinte des géants (The Imprint of Giants) (1980) - Lucie Dromner
 Vive la mariée (1980, short)
 Instinct de femme (1981) - Marthe
 La meute (1981, TV movie) - Rose
 La Tribu des vieux enfants (1982, TV movie) - Flore
 Room Service (1982, short)
 Liberty Belle (Liberty Belle) (1983) - Elise
  (Closed Circuit) (1983) - Juliet
 Garçon! (Waiter!) (1983) - Coline
 Le Cri du printemps (1983, Short)
 Akropolis Now (1984) - Camille
 Passage secret (1985) - Anita (final film role)

References

External links

 
 
 
 

1952 births
1985 deaths
People from Saint-Mandé
French film actresses
Burials at Montmartre Cemetery
20th-century French actresses